Vantanea depleta is a species of plant in the Humiriaceae family. It is endemic to Panama.  It is threatened by habitat loss.

References

Humiriaceae
Flora of Panama
Endangered plants
Taxonomy articles created by Polbot